Minuscule 208 (in the Gregory-Aland numbering), ε 127 (Soden), is a Greek minuscule manuscript of the New Testament, on parchment. Paleographically it has been assigned to the 11th century. It has marginalia.

Description 

The codex contains a complete text of the four Gospels on 239 parchment leaves (size ). The text is written in one column per page, in 23 lines per page.

There is also another division according to the smaller Ammonian Sections (in Mark 233 sections, the last in 16:8), with references to the Eusebian Canons (written below Ammonian Section numbers).

The text of John 7:53-8:11 is placed at the end of the Gospel of John.

Text 

The Greek text of the codex is a representative of the Byzantine text-type. Hermann von Soden classified it to the textual family Kx. Aland placed it in Category V.
According to the Claremont Profile Method it represents Kx in Luke 1 and Luke 20. In Luke 10 no profile was made.

History 

The manuscript was examined by Birch and Burgon. C. R. Gregory saw it in 1886.

It is currently housed at the Biblioteca Marciana (Gr. Z 9), at Venice.

See also 
 List of New Testament minuscules
 Biblical manuscript
 Textual criticism

References

Further reading 

 

Greek New Testament minuscules
11th-century biblical manuscripts